Terror in the Mall is a 1998 thriller television film directed by Norberto Barba and starring Rob Estes, Shannon Sturges, David Soul, Kai Wiesinger and Angeline Ball. The film is about a group of people trapped in a deserted mall during a flood along with an escaped prisoner.

Premise
During a heavy flood a group of people become trapped in a deserted mall. Notwithstanding, this is not their biggest problem as an escaped prisoner is with them.

Cast
 Rob Estes as Glen Savoy
 Shannon Sturges as Dr. Sheri Maratos
 David Soul as Roger Karey
 Kai Wiesinger as Chris Maratos
 Angeline Ball as Suzanne Price

Reception

References

External links 
 

1998 films
1998 television films
1998 thriller films
American thriller television films
Films scored by Christopher Franke
English-language German films
1990s English-language films
1990s American films